Nicholas Patrick Day (born 16 October 1947) is an English actor, who is currently the narrator on the Netflix series Myths & Monsters.

Life
He attended Alleyn's School, Dulwich before studying at the University of Bristol, 
Day was a supply teacher at Plumstead Manor School for Girls' for a brief time during the early 1980s, where he taught Drama.

Acting
He is perhaps best known for playing Detective Sergeant Michael Morley in Minder from 1991 to 1993. He also played Deputy Assistant Commissioner Donald Bevan in Series One of the BBC drama New Tricks. He portrayed Jack The Ripper, in series six (episode five) of Goodnight Sweetheart in 1999, and played another police officer, DCS John Meredith, in a single episode of Foyle's War in 2008. In 2009 he appeared in Margaret and The Take, and as Martin Crisp in The Dogleg Murders (Series 12 of Midsomer Murders.)

His film roles include appearances in Penelope Pulls It Off (1975), The Golden Bowl (2000), Russian Dolls (2005) and Amazing Grace (2006).

2010s 

In 2010 he played Colonel Montford in Joe Johnston's horror film The Wolfman.

In 2013, he played the headmaster in Alan Bennett's play The History Boys at Sheffield's Crucible Theatre.

He also worked with the Royal Shakespeare Company for seven seasons including the World Shakespeare Festival, working on classics like The Tempest and Twelfth Night.

Since 2015 he has presented Murder Maps which is made by Netflix in the United Kingdom and is now in its fifth series in the UK.  Murder Maps is also shown on Yesterday. In 2021, he narrated Railway Murders.

References

External links 

1947 births
English male film actors
Living people
Male actors from Kent
People from Gillingham, Kent
20th-century English male actors
21st-century English male actors
English male television actors